"The King and Queen of America" is a song recorded by pop music duo Eurythmics. It was written by group members Annie Lennox and David A. Stewart and produced by Stewart with Jimmy Iovine. The track appears on their album We Too Are One and was released as the album's third UK single in January 1990.

The song's music video showed Lennox and Stewart in a variety of costumes and settings which parodied various aspects of American pop culture, including a game show host and hostess, singing cowboy and cowgirl à la Roy Rogers and Dale Evans, and Ronald and Nancy Reagan.

Although not released as a single in the United States, "The King and Queen of America" received a fair amount of airplay on MTV.

Background
Speaking to the Chicago Tribune in 1989, Lennox spoke about the song and its message:

Track listings

CD single
 "The King And Queen of America" (Album Version) - 4:31
 "There Must Be An Angel (Playing with My Heart)" (Live) - 6:30*
 "I Love You Like A Ball And Chain" (Live) - 4:41*
 "See No Evil" (Non-LP Track) - 4:10
 same recording found on Live 1983–1989

7" single
A: "The King And Queen of America" (Album Version) - 4:31
B: "See No Evil" (Non-LP Track) - 4:10

12" single
A: "The King And Queen of America" (Dance Remix) - 6:11
B1: "The King And Queen of America" (Dub Remix) - 4:52
B2: "See No Evil" (Non-LP Track) - 4:10

12" single
A: "The King And Queen of America" (Dub Remix) - 4:52
B1: "The King And Queen of America" (Album Version) - 4:31
B2: "The King And Queen of America" (Dance Remix) - 6:11

Charts

References 

1989 songs
1990 singles
Eurythmics songs
RCA Records singles
Songs written by David A. Stewart
Songs written by Annie Lennox
Song recordings produced by Jimmy Iovine
Song recordings produced by Dave Stewart (musician and producer)